Johannes Jacobsen (27 December 1898 – 7 March 1932) was a Danish wrestler. He competed in the men's freestyle welterweight and the Greco-Roman middleweight events at the 1928 Summer Olympics.

References

External links
 

1898 births
1932 deaths
Danish male sport wrestlers
Olympic wrestlers of Denmark
Wrestlers at the 1928 Summer Olympics
Sportspeople from Copenhagen